Ellesmere Port & Neston F.C. was an English association football club.

History
The club competed in the FA Vase during the 1980s, played in the Cheshire County League Division Two for the 1981–82 season and were founder members of North West Counties Football League in the 1982–83 season, playing in the league until 1988–89.

The club played at Ellesmere Port Stadium at one stage.

Records
Best FA Vase performance: 3rd Round – 1985–86

References

Defunct football clubs in England
Defunct football clubs in Cheshire
Sport in Ellesmere Port
North West Counties Football League clubs
Cheshire County League clubs